The Newport 27-3, also called the Newport 27 Mark III, is an American sailboat that was designed by the Canadian design firm of C&C Design as a cruiser-racer and first built in 1975.

Production
The design was built by Capital Yachts in Harbor City, California, United States, starting in 1975, but it is now out of production.

Design
The Newport 27-3 is a recreational keelboat, built predominantly of fiberglass, with wood trim. It has a masthead sloop rig, a raked stem, a slightly angled transom, an internally mounted spade-type rudder controlled by a wheel and a fixed fin keel. It displaces .

The boat may be optionally fitted with a Universal Atomic 4 gasoline engine for docking and maneuvering.

The design was factory delivered with two different cabin layouts. The "aft-cabin" arrangement has sleeping accommodation for six people, with a double "V"-berth in the bow cabin, two straight settee berths in the main cabin and an aft cabin with a double berth on the starboard side. The galley is located on both sides of the companionway ladder, with a two-burner stove to starboard and an ice box and sink to port. The head is located just aft of the galley on the port side.

The "traditional" layout has sleeping accommodation for four people, with a double "V"-berth in the bow cabin and two straight settee berths in the main cabin. The galley is located on both sides of the companionway ladder, with a two-burner stove to starboard and an ice box and sink to port. The head is located just aft of the bow cabin on the port side.

See also
List of sailing boat types

References

Keelboats
1970s sailboat type designs
Sailing yachts
Sailboat type designs by C&C Design
Sailboat types built by Capital Yachts